The Morosco Photoplay Company was created in 1914 by Frank Garbutt. It was named for Oliver Morosco. In 1916, it was acquired by Famous Players-Lasky Corporation and became a subsidiary. Charles Eyton was appointed to supervise the company's productions.

It was one of the initial companies involved with Associated Motion Picture Advertisers.

The studio's productions were produced at 201 North Occidental in Hollywood.

Filmography
The Wild Olive (1915)
Captain Courtesy (1915)
Kilmeny (film) (1915)
Pretty Mrs. Smith (1915)
Peer Gynt (1915 film)
The Rug Maker's Daughter (1915)
Help Wanted (1915 film)
Sunshine Molly (1915)
Little Sunset (1915)
Betty in Search of a Thrill (1915)
An International Marriage (1916)
The Stronger Love (1916)
Redeeming Love (film) (1916)
The Road to Love (1916)
Her Father's Son (1916)
Pasquale (film) (1916)
The Making of Maddalena (1916)
Out of the Wreck (1917)
The World Apart (1917)
His Sweetheart (1917)
The Varmint (1917)
Happiness of Three Women (1917)
The Cook of Canyon Camp (1917)
Giving Becky a Chance (1917)
Jack and Jill (1917 film) (1917)
The Highway of Hope (1917)
The Marcellini Millions (1917)
The Highway of Hope (1917)
Out of the Wreck (1917)
His Majesty, Bunker Bean (1918)

References

1914 establishments in California
Silent film studios
American companies established in 1914